Lavanda (Italian "washing", Russian "lavender") may refer to:

Lavanda (foot washing), as performed by Pius IX in the sala over the portico of St. Peter's
Lavanda, Crimea (Лаванда), population 206 in the 2014 census
Lavanda, a unit of the Internal Troops of Ukraine
Lavanda (song) (Лаванда), a 1985 song by Sofia Rotaru

See also

Lavanya (name)
Lavandula